Healing Hands (妙手仁心) is a 1998 Hong Kong medical drama series that ran on TVB Jade. It focuses on the lives and loves of the doctors and nurses at the fictional Yan Oi Hospital in Hong Kong. It is noted for its realism in depicting medical situations, thanks to the help of the Hong Kong Hospital Authority, who had loaned actual hospital equipment and facilities for filming. It can be considered the Hong Kong equivalent to the American television series ER, although its storyline are arguably mirrored in another American series, Grey's Anatomy. Lawrence Ng is the main star of the show as neurosurgeon  Dr. Paul Ching Chi Mei. The other main role is played by Bowie Lam, who plays Dr. Henry Lai Kwok Chu as an accident and emergency doctor who is best friends with Paul.

The show was followed by two sequels, Healing Hands II (2000) and Healing Hands III (2005).

Cast

Leading stars
Lawrence Ng as Paul Ching Chi-mei (程至美) 
Bowie Lam as Henry Lai Kwok-chu (黎國柱)
Flora Chan as Annie Kong Sun-yuet (江新月)
Ada Choi as Jackie Tong Chi-lai (唐姿禮)
Nick Cheung as Peter Cheung Chong-yip (張創業)
William So as Gilbert Kong Moon-yuet (江滿月)
Steven Ma as Joe Cheung Ka-yu (張家裕)
Astrid Chan as Helen Ling Siu-ha (凌少霞)
Angela Tong as Judy Chow Suk-yan (周淑茵)

Recurring stars
Kenny Wong as Ho Tak-kwong (何德廣)
Shirley Cheung as May Au Ka-ping (區嘉平)
Eileen Yeow as Suki Chow Suk-ying (周淑瑛)
Jojo Cho as Amy Yim Tung (嚴冬)

Notes and references

External links
Healing Hands Reviews - www.spcnet.tv

|-
! colspan="3" style="background: #DAA520;" | TVB Anniversary Awards
|-

|align="center" colspan="4"|Before:Rural Hero - August 28
|align="center" colspan="4"|TVB Jade Second line series 1998Healing HandsAugust 31 - October 9
|align="center" colspan="4"|Next:Burning FlameOctober 12 -
|-
|align="center" colspan="4"|Before:None
|align="center" colspan="4"|TVB Jade The Final Episode Special - Saturday at 21:30-23:30Healing HandsOctober 10
|align="center" colspan="4"|Next:None

TVB dramas
1998 Hong Kong television series debuts
1998 Hong Kong television series endings
Chinese medical television series